The two-striped garter snake (Thamnophis hammondii) is a species of aquatic garter snake, which is endemic to western North America.

Taxonomy and etymology
The specific name hammondii is in honor of William A. Hammond, the U.S. Army surgeon who collected the first specimens.

Description
T. hammondii is a medium-sized snake, 18-30 inches in total length (including tail), with a head barely wider than the neck. Two common color variations occur in the wild, a striped variant and a checkered variant. The striped variant has a yellowish lateral stripe on each side, and a fairly uniform dorsal coloring. The checkered variant lacks the lateral stripes and has two rows of small dark spots on each side.

Geographic range, habitat, and diet
The two-striped garter snake is found in western North America, ranging from central California to Baja California, Mexico. It is a highly aquatic species, and prefers habitat adjacent to permanent or semi-permanent bodies of water. This species feeds primarily on fish and amphibians.

References

Further reading
Boulenger GA (1893). Catalogue of the Snakes in the British Museum (Natural History). Volume I., Containing the Families ... Colubridæ Aglyphæ, part. London: Trustees of the British Museum (Natural History). (Taylor and Francis, printers). xiii + 448 pp. + Plates I-XXVIII. (Tropidonotus ordinatus Var. hammondi, p. 210).
Kennicott R (1860). "Descriptions of New Species of North American Serpents in the Museum of the Smithsonian Institution, Washington". Proc. Acad. Nat. Sci. Philadelphia 12: 328–338. (Eutænia hammondii, new species, p. 332).
Schmidt KP, Davis DD (1941). Field Book of Snakes of the United States and Canada. New York: G.P. Putnam's Sons. 365 pp. (Thamnophis hammondii, p. 249 + Plate 28).
Smith HM, Brodie ED Jr (1982). Reptiles of North America: A Guide to Field Identification. New York: Golden Press. 240 pp.  (paperback),  (hardcover). (Thamnophis couchi hammondi, p. 150).
Stebbins RC (2003). A Field Guide to Western Reptiles and Amphibians, Third Edition. The Peterson Field Guide Series ®. Boston and New York: Houghton Mifflin Company. xiii + 533 pp. . (Thamnophis hammondii, pp. 385–386 + Figure 27 on p. 383 + Plate 49 + Map 167).
Stejneger L, Barbour T (1917). A Check List of North American Amphibians and Reptiles. Cambridge, Massachusetts: Harvard University Press. 125 pp. (Thamnophis hammondi, p. 101).
Wright AH, Wright AA (1957). Handbook of Snakes of the United States and Canada. Ithaca and London: Comstock Publishing Associates, a division of Cornell University Press. 1,105 pp. (in two volumes). (Thamnophis elegans hammondi, pp. 788–791, Figure 226 + Map 58 on p. 763).

Thamnophis
Snakes of North America
Fauna of California
Fauna of the Baja California Peninsula
Reptiles of Mexico
Reptiles of the United States
Reptiles described in 1860
Taxa named by Robert Kennicott
Taxonomy articles created by Polbot